Lingyun County is a county in the northwest of Guangxi, China. It is under the administration of Baise city.

Climate

References 

 
Counties of Guangxi
Counties and cities in Baise